Breaking All the Rules is the seventh studio album by English musician Peter Frampton, released on May 14, 1981, A&M Records.

Background
The Breaking All the Rules album had featured a raw live in the studio approach like its predecessor Rise Up, which was a Brazilian release to promote Frampton's concert tour in Brazil in 1980. The album had won airplay for its anthemic title track, which was co-written with Procol Harum lyricist Keith Reid. The album's cover was photographed at 350 W 23rd Street, Chelsea, New York City.

Track listing
All tracks written by Peter Frampton except where indicated.

 "Dig What I Say" - 4:09
 "I Don't Wanna Let You Go" - 4:18
 "Rise Up" (Alessi Brothers) - 3:46
 "Wasting the Night Away" - 4:08
 "Going to L.A." - 5:54
 "You Kill Me" - 4:12
 "Friday on My Mind" (George Young, Harry Vanda) - 4:15
 "Lost a Part of You" - 3:39
 "Breaking All the Rules" (Frampton, Keith Reid) - 7:05

Charts

Personnel
Peter Frampton - guitar, keyboards, vocals
Steve Lukather - guitar
John Regan -  bass guitar
Arthur Stead - piano, synthesizer, electric piano, organ, Fender Rhodes
Jeff Porcaro - drums, percussion

References

1981 albums
Peter Frampton albums
Albums produced by Chris Kimsey
Albums produced by Peter Frampton
Albums produced by David Kershenbaum
A&M Records albums